Elma Ann Bellini (November 11, 1954 – March 4, 2018) was an American judge who served on the New York Supreme Court.

Background
Bellini was born in South Fork, Pennsylvania on November 11, 1954. She graduated from Monroe Community College, The College at Brockport, State University of New York, and Syracuse University College of Law. Bellini served in the public defenders office.

She was elected as Monroe County, New York judge in 2000, and then served on the New York Supreme Court from 2008 until her death from cancer in 2018. Bellini was a Republican. She lived in Webster, New York, and had been married to her husband, Jim Stevenson, for 20 years at the time of her death.

Notes

1954 births
2018 deaths
People from Cambria County, Pennsylvania
People from Webster, New York
State University of New York at Brockport alumni
Monroe Community College alumni
Syracuse University College of Law alumni
New York (state) Republicans
New York Supreme Court Justices
Deaths from cancer in New York (state)
20th-century American judges